Leigh Christian is an American actress best known for her guest starring roles on many major television series during the 1970s and 1980s including The Rockford Files, Hawaii Five-O, The Six Million Dollar Man, 
McCloud, Knight Rider, Starsky and Hutch, The Ghost Busters, Emergency! (S5Ep12), amongst others. Christian also appeared in Barnaby Jones in 1975.

Early life
Christian was born in Pittsburgh, Pennsylvania daughter of Dorothy Mae Close; she is the oldest of six siblings. Graduating high school with high honors, she continued her education and holds an associate degree in Liberal Arts from Santa Monica College. Her interests in psychology and physical health later led her to pursue further education in those fields obtaining proficiency certificates as a Sports Nutritionist and Fitness Instructor, Educational Kinesiology techniques, and practicing Aromatherapy and Physical Therapy.

Career 
Christian began her entertainment career in Kansas City, Missouri, shooting two commercials that qualified her for a SAG card when she moved to Hollywood in 1968. She continued doing commercials throughout her career, totaling over 100 shoots.

Film 
Christian had roles in Disney's The World's Greatest Athlete (1973) and two cult films: The Doll Squad (1973), directed by Ted Mikels, and Beyond Atlantis (1973), directed by the famous Filipino impresario of horror genre films, Eddie Romero. She also had a co-starring role in Butterfly (1982), the debut movie of Pia Zadora directed by Matt Cimber. Christian's role in Beyond Atlantis as Syrene, the undersea princess, earned her a place in an Australian Film Company's documentary entitled Machete Maidens Unleashed! (2010).

Television 

The Rockford Files
McCloudHawaii Five-OThe Six Million Dollar ManKnight RiderStarsky and HutchThe Ghost BustersBarnaby JonesHunterThe Fall GuyT. J. HookerJessieMatt HoustonEmergency!Sword of JusticeTomaOwen Marshall: Counselor at LawGriffFlying HighNight GalleryThe D.A.Marcus Welby M.D.CannonChaseVega$Movies of the Week include Intimate AgonyDelta County U.S.A.Six Million Dollar Man: Solid Gold Kidnapping''

Personal life 
In 1977, Christian married, moved to Las Vegas, and gave birth to her son Tao-by A. Aleman in 1978. Christian ended her marriage in 1983, and entered the business world. She had a brief retirement in 2008; and in 2012, she was back in Los Angeles pursuing her acting career.

References

External links 
 

Actresses from Pittsburgh
American television actresses
20th-century American actresses
Living people
Santa Monica College alumni
21st-century American women
Year of birth missing (living people)